Droß is a municipality in the district of Krems-Land, Lower Austria, Austria.

Population

Twin towns
Droß is twinned with:

  Fátima, Portugal

Personalities
Franz Krenn, composer, was born here.

References

External links
Municipal website
website of the Dross:Network

Cities and towns in Krems-Land District